Muddu Babu Shetty (1 January 1931 – 23 January 1982) simply known as, M. B. Shetty, or Shetty was an Indian film stuntman and action choreographer and  actor in Hindi cinema in 1970. He had a towering personality with a bald head, often cast as the villain brought down by heroes half his size. He was the father of director Rohit Shetty.

Early life
He was born in 1931 in Mangalore, India. He arrived to Bombay from Udupi. His mother tongue was Tulu. He started as a waiter in Cotton Green after which he got into boxing and bodybuilding.

Film career
He started off as a Fight Instructor in the 1956 movie Heer. He was cast as villain and composed stunts for numerous Hindi and Kannada cinema in the 1970s. He was an action director, doing over 700 films, including cult films like Don, The Great Gambler, Trishul and Deewaar. Shetty also starred with MGR, in Navarathinam (1977) Tamil movie.

Personal life
His first wife was Vinodini, with whom he had two daughters and two sons. With his second wife, Ratna, he had another son, the film director Rohit Shetty.

Filmography (stunts)

Filmography (acting)

See also
 List of Indian film actors

References

External links
 
 

1938 births
Place of death missing
1982 deaths
20th-century Indian male actors
Indian action choreographers
Indian male film actors
Indian stunt performers
Male actors from Mangalore
Male actors in Hindi cinema
Mangaloreans
People from Dakshina Kannada district
Tulu people